Manasi Moghe (born 29 August 1991) is a titleholder who was crowned Miss Diva Universe 2013 and represented India at Miss Universe 2013 in Moscow, Russia on 9 November 2013. A big favourite, she made it to the top 10 finalist as 5th runner-up.

Early life
Manasi Moghe was born in Indore, Madhya Pradesh, India into a Marathi family. She completed her schooling from Sri Sathya Sai Vidya Vihar, Indore.

Pageantry

Miss Universe 2013
Miss Universe 2013 Pageant was held at Crocus City Hall, Moscow, Russia. Finale was on 9 November 2013 and Manasi Moghe placed among the Top 10 finalists as fifth runner-up.

Miss Diva - 2013

The Miss Diva - 2013 finale, held on 5 September 2013 Thursday night at Hotel Westin Mumbai Garden City, saw 14 finalists, including Manasi Moghe, competing against each other to win the title.

Manasi Moghe was crowned Miss Diva Universe 2013, while Gurleen Grewal was declared Miss Diva International 2013 and Srishti Rana was declared Miss Diva Asia Pacific World 2013.

Manasi then competed at Miss Universe 2013 in Moscow, finishing in the Top 10.

Femina Miss India 2013
Manasi was one of the 21 finalists of Femina Miss India 2013. She got Wild Card Entry to the Pageant where she won Miss Active sub-title.

Film career
Manasi made her cinematic debut in a Marathi language film title Bugadi Maazi Sandli Ga in the year 2014. She paired up with Kashyap Parulekar in the film.
She is starring in a film opposite superstar Ankush Choudhary in an upcoming Marathi film directed by Satish Rajwade.

Filmography

References 

Living people
1991 births
Miss Universe 2013 contestants
Marathi people
Actresses from Indore
Actresses in Marathi cinema
Indian film actresses
21st-century Indian actresses